An  (plural – ; OLG, or in Berlin Kammergericht: KG) is a higher court in Germany.

There are 24  in Germany and they deal with civil and criminal matters. They are positioned above regional courts (Landgerichte) and below the Federal Court of Justice, in family and child law above the local courts (Amtsgericht) and below the Federal Court of Justice. In criminal cases that are under primary jurisdiction of the Federal Court of Justice (i.e., cases concerning national security), the Oberlandesgerichte act as branches of the Federal Court of Justice, that is, as "lower federal courts" (Untere Bundesgerichte).

As per Section 120 , OLGs have original jurisdiction (Erstinstanz) over crimes against public international law under the Völkerstrafgesetzbuch (genocide, crimes against humanity, and war crimes). This includes trials under universal jurisdiction (that were committed by non-Germans outside of Germany).

The OLG Düsseldorf is one of the most popular patent trial forums for patentees in Europe.

The  were first set up in the German Empire by the Courts Constitution Act of 27 January 1877. In Prussia, there had been  as the higher provincial courts since 1808, known as Regierung from 1723 to 1808.

The individual Higher Regional Courts 
As of 2023 there are 24 Higher Regional Courts in Germany. Each German state has at least one Higher Regional Court. Baden-Württemberg and Rhineland-Palatinate each have two, Bavaria, Lower Saxony and North Rhine-Westphalia each have three Higher Regional Courts.

For historical reasons the Higher Regional Court in Berlin is called the Kammergericht and the Higher Regional Courts in Hamburg and Bremen are called Hanseatic Higher Regional Court.

Notes

References

Further reading 
 

Courts in Germany
Appellate courts